Hoover sound refers to a particular synthesizer sound in electronic music, commonly used in rave techno, hardcore techno, gabber, breakbeat hardcore, trance, hard house and hard NRG.  Originally called the "Mentasm", the name that stuck was the one likening the sound to that of a vacuum cleaner (often referred to via the genericized trademark "hoover" in the UK and Ireland).

The sound

The Hoover is a complex waveform that can be created with three oscillators, each spaced an octave apart, a heavy use of pulse-width modulation and a thick chorus effect.  The sound is characterised by its thick swirliness that stems from a fast LFO controlling the PWM and the chorus.  It was originally created by Eric Persing for the Roland Alpha Juno, although the term 'hoover' was not introduced by him.

It is traditionally created with the Roland Alpha Juno-2, Alpha Juno 1, or rack mount version MKS-50 synthesizer using the built-in What the patch.  The hoover sound generated on these synthesizers is unique for the use of a "PWM" sawtooth wave, which inserts flat segments of variable width into a sawtooth waveform.

History and popularization

The hoover sound is believed to first have appeared in a commercial production in "Mentasm" by Second Phase (1991), produced in a collaboration between Joey Beltram and Mundo Muzique, and sometimes is referred to as a "mentasm". However, mentasm normally refers to the sound sampled from this tune and re-used. This sound was widely used in Belgian techno tracks of the early 1990's.

Another notable example of a record using a hoover sound is "Dominator" by Dutch techno pioneers Human Resource. This track gained fame in 1991 and became a top 10 hit worldwide. Characteristic for this track was not only the hoover, but also the over-the-top rap: "I'm bigger and bolder and rougher and tougher, in other words, sucker, there is no other... I'm the one and only dominator... Wanna kiss myself!"

The sound has also been used in video games such as Streets of Rage 3, which was composed by Yuzo Koshiro and Motohiro Kawashima and Robotron X by Aubrey Hodges.

Works featuring the hoover sound

References

External links
 A Hoover patch for Native Instrument's Massive
 An original Hoover sound bank for Native Instrument's Kontakt and EXS-24
 Dubspot Video Tutorial: Reverse Engineering the Hoover sound - Using The Bloody Beetroots and Steve Aoki's "Warp 1.9" as example
 Reverse-engineering the rave hoover - includes some technical analysis of the sound
 A hoover by the Modor NF-1
 ALPHA JUNO / MKS-50 / HS HOMEPAGE - A Website Dedicated To The Alpha Juno-1 / Alpha Juno-2 / MKS-50 / HS-10 / HS-80 Synths ▻▻▻ Tones, Utilities, Info, DIY's and Reference Materials ◅◅◅

Electronic music